Witold's Report, also known as Pilecki's Report, is a report about the Auschwitz concentration camp written in 1943 by Witold Pilecki, a Polish military officer and member of the Polish resistance. Pilecki volunteered in 1940 to be imprisoned in Auschwitz to organize a resistance movement and send out information about the camp. He escaped from Auschwitz in April 1943. His was the first comprehensive record of a Holocaust death camp to be obtained by the Allies.  

The report includes details about the gas chambers, "Selektion", and sterilization experiments. It states that there were three crematoria in Auschwitz II capable of cremating 8,000 people daily.

Pilecki's Report preceded and complemented the Auschwitz Protocols, compiled from late 1943, which warned about the mass murder and other atrocities taking place at the camp. The Auschwitz Protocols comprise the Polish Major's Report by Jerzy Tabeau, who escaped with Roman Cieliczko on 19 November 1943 and compiled a report between December 1943 and January 1944; the Vrba-Wetzler report; and the Rosin-Mordowicz report.

Background
On 9 November 1939, after the Polish Army had been defeated in the invasion of Poland, Cavalry Captain Witold Pilecki, together with his commander, Major Jan Włodarkiewicz, founded the Secret Polish Army (Tajna Armia Polska, TAP). In 1940 Pilecki presented to his superiors a plan to enter Germany's Auschwitz concentration camp, gather intelligence on the camp, and organize inmate resistance. At the time, little was known about how the Germans ran the camp, which appeared to operate as an internment, or large prison, camp. Pilecki's superiors approved his plan and provided him with a false identity card in the name of "Tomasz Serafiński". On 19 September 1940 he deliberately went out during a  Warsaw street roundup (łapanka) and was caught by the Germans, along with some 2,000 innocent civilians. After two days' detention in the Light Horse Guards Barracks, where prisoners suffered beatings with rubber batons, Pilecki was sent to Auschwitz and was assigned inmate number 4859.

In Auschwitz
Inside the camp Pilecki organized an underground Military Organization (Związek Organizacji Wojskowej, ZOW), connected with other smaller underground organizations. 
Pilecki planned a general uprising in Auschwitz and hoped that the Allies would drop arms or troops into the camp (most likely the Polish 1st Independent Parachute Brigade, based in Great Britain), and that the Home Army would organize an assault on the camp from outside. In 1943, the Gestapo redoubled its efforts to ferret out ZOW members, succeeding in killing many of them. Pilecki decided to break out of the camp, hoping to personally convince Home Army leaders about his idea of the uprising in Auschwitz. On the night of April 26/27, 1943, Pilecki made a daring escape from the camp, but the Home Army did not accept his insurgency plan, as the Allies considered his reports about the Holocaust exaggerated.

The report 
ZOW's intelligence network inside the camp started to send regular reports to the Home Army from October 1940. Beginning in November 1940, the first information about genocide occurring in the camp was sent via ZOW to Home Army Headquarters in Warsaw. From March 1941 onwards Witold Pilecki's messages were forwarded to the Polish government in exile in London and, through it, to the British government and other Allied governments. These reports informed the Allies about the unfolding Holocaust and were the principal source of intelligence on Auschwitz-Birkenau for the Western Allies.

On June 20, 1942, four Poles, Kazimierz Piechowski,  and Józef Lempart, made a daring escape from Auschwitz camp.
Dressed as members of the SS-Totenkopfverbände, fully armed and in an SS staff car, they drove out the main gate in a stolen automobile, a Steyr 220 belonging to Rudolf Höss. Jaster, a member of ZOW, carried with him a detailed report about conditions in the camp, written by Pilecki. The Germans never recaptured any of them.

After his own daring escape from Auschwitz on April 27, 1943, Pilecki wrote Raport W. The report was signed by other members of the Polish underground who worked with ZOW: Aleksander Wielopolski, Stefan Bielecki, Antoni Woźniak, Aleksander Paliński, Ferdynand Trojnicki, Eleonora Ostrowska and Stefan Miłkowski, and it included a section called "Teren S" which contained a list of ZOW members. Later, after his release from the German prisoner-of-war camp at Murnau in 1945, Pilecki compiled a version of the report that was over 100 pages long.

The first publication of Witold's Report took place in 2000, 55 years after the war, after it was reconstructed and published by Adam Cyra in his book Rotmistrz Pilecki. Ochotnik do Auschwitz. Additional documents were discovered in 2009. An English translation was published in 2012 under the title The Auschwitz Volunteer: Beyond Bravery.

See also
Raczyński's Note
The Polish White Book
The Black Book of Poland
Auschwitz Protocols
The Volunteer (book)
Vrba–Wetzler report
Karski's reports
Pilecki Institute

References

Further reading
 Adam Cyra, Ochotnik do Auschwitz. Witold Pilecki 1901–1948, Chrześcijańskie Stowarzyszenie Rodzin Oświęcimskich, Oświęcim 2000
 Cyra, Adam Spadochroniarz Urban [Paratrooper Urban], Oświęcim 2005.
 Cyra, Adam and Wiesław Jan Wysocki, Rotmistrz Witold Pilecki, Oficyna Wydawnicza VOLUMEN, 1997. 
 Jacek Pawłowicz, Rotmistrz Witold Pilecki 1901–1948, 2008, .
 Foot, Michael Richard Daniell (2003), Six Faces of Courage. Secret agents against Nazi tyranny. Witold Pilecki, Leo Cooper, 
 Lewis, Jon E. (1999), The Mammoth Book of True War Stories, Carroll & Graf Publishers, 
 Piekarski, Konstanty R. (1990), Escaping Hell: The Story of a Polish Underground Officer in Auschwitz and Buchenwald, Dundurn Press Ltd., 
 Tchorek, Kamil (March 12, 2009), Double life of Witold Pilecki, the Auschwitz volunteer who uncovered Holocaust secrets, London: The Times, http://www.timesonline.co.uk/tol/news/world/europe/article5891132.ece, retrieved March 16, 2009
 Wyman, David S.; Garlinski, Jozef (December 1976), "Review: Jozef Garlinski. Fighting Auschwitz: The Resistance Movement in the Concentration Camp", American Historical Review (American Historical Association) 81 (5): 1168–1169, 
Ciesielski E., Wspomnienia Oświęcimskie [Auschwitz Memoirs], Kraków, 1968
Garlinski, Jozef, Fighting Auschwitz: the Resistance Movement in the Concentration Camp, Fawcett, 1975, reprinted by Time Life Education, 1993. 
Gawron, W. Ochotnik do Oświęcimia [Volunteer for Auschwitz], Calvarianum, Auschwitz Museum, 1992
Patricelli, M. "Il volontario" [The Volunteer], Laterza 2010, .
Wysocki, Wiesław Jan. Rotmistrz Pilecki, Pomost, 1994. 
Kon Piekarski "Escaping Hell: The Story of a Polish Underground Officer in Auschwitz and Buchenwald", Dundurn Press Ltd., 1989,

External links

 Staff correspondent (March 5, 1948), Polish Left-Wing Relations: No Fusion as Yet, London: The Times, pp. 3, retrieved March 12, 2009
 
 
 The Murder of Cavalry Captain Witold Pilecki
 Witold Pilecki's report from Auschwitz (rtf) / mirror (HTML)
 Additional reports of Pilecki
 Andrzej M. Kobos,  Witold Pilecki w Piekle XX Wieku, Zwoje 5 (9), 1998
Biography of Witold Pilecki on Diapozytyw
Józef Garlinski,  The Polish Underground Movement and Auschwitz Concentration Camp, 2003
 Episodes from Auschwitz: Witolds Report. Witold Pilecki's time at Auschwitz and post-War fate presented as a graphic history.
 Meet The Man Who Sneaked Into Auschwitz.
 Witold’s Report from Auschwitz Download (PDF) from http://rtmpilecki.eu/raport-3/ , 2018

Government reports
1943 in Poland
Holocaust historical documents
Auschwitz concentration camp
1943 documents